Par signal box is a Grade II listed former Great Western Railway signal box, located on Par railway station in Cornwall, England.

Located at the southern end of Platform 2, when first built it was less than half its current length, only containing 26 levers. In 1913, the frame was replaced, and a new frame of 57 levers was added. Signals controlled from Par carry the identification code 'PR'.

In July 2013, it was one of 26 "highly distinctive" signal boxes listed by Ed Vaizey, minister for the Department for Culture, Media and Sport in July 2013, in a joint initiative by English Heritage and Network Rail to preserve and provide a window into how railways were operated in the past.

References

Great Western Railway
Rail transport in Cornwall
Grade II listed buildings in Cornwall
Signal boxes in the United Kingdom
Industrial archaeological sites in Cornwall
St Blazey